CVS may refer to:

Organizations
 CVS Health, a US pharmacy chain
 CVS Pharmacy
 CVS Caremark, a prescription benefit management subsidiary
 Council for Voluntary Service, England
 Cable Video Store, former US pay-per-view service
 CVS Ferrari, an Italian mobile handling equipment manufacturer
 Chicago Vocational High School, US

Science
 Cardiovascular system
 Cyclic vomiting syndrome
 Chorionic villus sampling, a form of prenatal testing
 Computer vision syndrome, from excessive computer display use
 CVS (enzyme), the enzyme responsible for the biosynthesis of valencene
 Coversine, in mathematics

Technology
 Computer-controlled Vehicle System, a personal rapid transit system developed in Japan
 Concurrent Versions System, a revision control system for software development
 Crankcase ventilation system, a system for allowing engine blow-by gases to escape

Other
 Anti-submarine warfare carrier, US hull classification symbol CVS
 C. V. S. Rao (1918–1993), a senior officer in the Indian police